First-seeded Bill Scanlon defeated Tim Wilkison 6–7, 6–3, 3–6, 7–6, 6–0 to win the 1981 Benson and Hedges Open singles competition. John Sadri was the champion but did not defend his title.

Seeds
A champion seed is indicated in bold text while text in italics indicates the round in which that seed was eliminated.

  Bill Scanlon (champion)
  Rod Frawley (first round)
  Russell Simpson (quarterfinals)
  Ferdi Taygan (quarterfinals)
  Tim Wilkison (final)
  Onny Parun (semifinals)
  Billy Martin (semifinals)
  Chris Mayotte (quarterfinals)

Draw

 NB: The Final was the best of 5 sets while all other rounds were the best of 3 sets.

Final

Section 1

Section 2

External links
 Association of Tennis Professional (ATP) – 1981 Men's Singles draw

Singles
ATP Auckland Open